Mỹ Thái is a commune (xã) and village in Lạng Giang District, Bắc Giang Province, in northeastern Vietnam.

References

Xă Mỹ Thái gồm 8 làng: Cò, Chi Lễ, Cầu Trong, Cầu Ngoài, Nguyên, Hạ, Cả, Thượng.

Populated places in Bắc Giang province
Communes of Bắc Giang province